Shiribagilu is a village in Kasaragod district in the state of Kerala, India.

It was the capital of  Mayipadi Kingdom, a Nagavamasha clan established by Mayura Varman.  Madhur Ganapathi Temple is the paradevata temple of Mayipadi kings. The current titular head Sri Dana Marthanda Varma Raja Ramantharasugal - XIII is the hereditary trustee of the temple.

Demographics
 India census, Shiribagilu had a population of 5288 with 2594 males and 2694 females.

References

Suburbs of Kasaragod